Čížová is a municipality and village in Písek District in the South Bohemian Region of the Czech Republic. It has about 1,300 inhabitants.

Administrative parts
Villages of Borečnice, Bošovice, Krašovice, Nová Ves, Topělec and Zlivice are administrative parts of Čížová.

Geography
It lies on the border of the Tábor Uplands and Blatná Uplands. The Otava River forms the eastern municipal border.

History

The first written mention of Čížová is from 1316.

Transport
Čížová has a train station on the railroad Písek–Zdice.

The D4 motorway passes through the southwestern part of the municipal territory.

Sights
The main landmark is the Church of Saint James the Great, which is situated on a hill above Čížová. The church has a Gothic core and its existence was first documented in 1407. The church is surrounded by a cemetery on which stays the Chapel of Saint Barbara and a historical bell tower. The Chapel of Saint Barbara dates from 1759.

References

External links

 

Villages in Písek District